Kida Poosari Magudi is a 2016 Indian Tamil-language film directed by J.Jayakumar. The film stars Ramdev, Thamizh and Malar in lead roles with actor Powerstar Srinivasan in a comic role. The film was shot at Thittakudi, Pennadam, Marungur Kuvagam and Thamarai Poondi.

Summary
Kida Poosari Magudi is the tale of love that happens after marriage.

Cast 
Ramdev as Selvam
Thamizh as Magudi 
Nakshatra as Malar
Srinivasan
Singampuli
Kalairani
Mu Ramaswamy as Thatha

Soundtrack
Music composed by Ilayaraja, lyrics written by Mu. Metha. The list of songs.

Reception
Malani Mannath of The New Indian Express mentioned that the film springs a surprise for its fairly neat screenplay and treatment, supported by good performances and a well thought-out climax. S.Shankar of FilmiBeat Tamil gave the film a rating of 3.5/5 stars, calling it as an "emotionalty gripping tale with laudable performance by all actors". He also stated that the director has mastered the trick to keep the audience intrigued from first scene itself while lauding Ilaiyaraaja's music as the backbone of the film.

The main actress, Natchithira, actually shaved her head for the movie.

References

External links
 

2016 films
2010s Tamil-language films
Films scored by Ilaiyaraaja